Ochterus americanus is a species of velvety shore bug in the family Ochteridae. It is found in North America.

References

Articles created by Qbugbot
Insects described in 1876
Ochteridae